Henry Elbert Stubbs (March 4, 1881 – February 28, 1937) was an American clergyman and politician who served two terms as a U.S. Representative from California from 1933 to 1937.

Biography 
Born in Nampa, Coleman County, Texas, Stubbs attended the public schools in Groesbeck, Texas, and Phillips University in Enid, Oklahoma.
He was ordained a minister of the Christian Church in 1911, and served as pastor of the Christian Church in Frederick, Oklahoma, from 1911 to 1914 and 1918–1921, and in Kingfisher, Oklahoma from 1914 to 1917.
He moved to California in 1921, and served as pastor of the Christian Church in Tulare, California, from 1921 to 1923 and of the Santa Maria (California) Christian Church from 1923 until elected to Congress.

Congress 
Stubbs was elected as a Democrat to the 73rd, 74th, and 75th Congresses, and served from March 4, 1933, until his death in Washington, DC, February 28, 1937.
He was interred in Santa Maria Cemetery, Santa Maria, California.

See also
 List of United States Congress members who died in office (1900–49)

External links

References

1881 births
1937 deaths
People from Coleman County, Texas
People from Groesbeck, Texas
People from Frederick, Oklahoma
People from Kingfisher, Oklahoma
People from Tulare, California
People from Santa Maria, California
Democratic Party members of the United States House of Representatives from California
Phillips University alumni
20th-century American politicians